Glyphostoma scalarinum is a species of sea snail, a marine gastropod mollusk in the family Clathurellidae.

Description
The shell grows to a length of 9 mm. The shell is whitish, with a narrow chestnut or chocolate sutural band, and another below the middle of the body whorl only.

Distribution
This species occurs in the Indian Ocean along Madagascar, Réunion; in the Central Pacific Ocean.

References

 Dautzenberg, Ph. (1929). Mollusques testacés marins de Madagascar. Faune des Colonies Francaises, Tome III

External links
 

scalarinum